Magnox Ltd is a nuclear decommissioning Site Licence Company (SLC) under the Nuclear Decommissioning Authority (NDA), a government body set up specifically to deal with the nuclear legacy under the Energy Act 2004. In September 2019, it became a direct subsidiary of the NDA.

Magnox Ltd is responsible for the decommissioning of ten Magnox nuclear power stations and two former research facilities in the United Kingdom. The twelve sites are located at Berkeley, Bradwell, Chapelcross, Dungeness A, Hinkley Point A, Hunterston A, Oldbury, Sizewell A, Trawsfynydd, Wylfa, Harwell and Winfrith. All the sites have ceased production. In addition, as part of the Trawsfynydd unit, Magnox Ltd generates hydro-electric power at Maentwrog power station.

The only Magnox power station in the United Kingdom not managed by Magnox Ltd is Calder Hall, which is part of the Sellafield site and is controlled by Sellafield Ltd.

History 

Magnox Ltd is the successor company to Magnox Electric, which was created in 1996 to take ownership of the Magnox assets from Nuclear Electric and Scottish Nuclear. The remaining nuclear power stations of these two companies, seven advanced gas-cooled reactor (AGR) sites and one pressurised water reactor (PWR) site, were transferred to a separate company, British Energy, which was then privatised in 1996. In January 1998, Magnox Electric came under the control of another government-owned company, British Nuclear Fuels Ltd, operating as BNFL Magnox Generation.

Following the reorganisation of the UK nuclear industry in 2005, ownership of BNFL's Magnox sites transferred to the newly created Nuclear Decommissioning Authority (NDA). BNFL created a new subsidiary, Reactor Sites Management Company (RSMC), to manage and operate Magnox Electric on behalf of the NDA. In June 2007, BNFL sold RSMC to the newly formed US company EnergySolutions; and transferred operational and management responsibilities of Magnox sites to the US company.

On 1 October 2008, Magnox Electric was split into two companies based on the locations of the sites. Magnox North became the operator of Chapelcross, Hunterston A, Oldbury, Trawsfynydd and Wylfa. Magnox South became and operator of Berkeley, Bradwell, Dungeness, Hinkley Point A and Sizewell A. Both companies continued to be managed by RSMC.

In January 2011, to reduce costs and to help extend best practices across all sites, it was decided to reverse the split with Magnox North and Magnox South recombining as Magnox Ltd.

In 2015, the Harwell and Winfrith sites managed by Research Sites Restoration Limited (RSRL) were brought under the management of Magnox Ltd.

In 2017, the NDA decided to terminate the contract with Cavendish Fluor Partnership believing a simplified approach would provide a more efficient decommissioning programme. Magnox Ltd became a subsidiary of the NDA on 3 September 2019.

In February 2018, the UK parliament's Public Accounts Committee (PAC) concluded that the NDA had "dramatically under-estimated" costs and "completely failed" in the procurement and management of the contract, which was one of the highest value contracts let by the government. An independent inquiry into the deal was set up.

See also 
 Nuclear power in the United Kingdom

References

External links 
 

Nuclear technology companies of the United Kingdom
Nuclear waste companies
2011 establishments in England
Waste companies established in 2011
British companies established in 2011